Richard L. Randolph (born April 10, 1936) is a longtime insurance agency owner in Fairbanks, Alaska who is best known as the first person to be elected to partisan office under the banner of the Libertarian Party with his election to the Alaska House of Representatives in 1978. He was re-elected in 1980.  After Alaska greatly increased its revenue from the development of oil, Randolph advocated the repeal of the state income tax. The effort was successful, with Alaska being one of only two states where residents pay neither an income nor a sales tax—the other being New Hampshire. He was also the LP's gubernatorial nominee in 1982, garnering nearly 15 percent of the vote.

Career

Dick Randolph was born in Salmon, Idaho and graduated from Idaho State College in 1960 with a B.A. in education. He moved to Alaska that same year to become a teacher, spending several years doing such in Valdez and South Naknek. He moved to Fairbanks in 1964 and founded a State Farm Insurance agency, becoming its top sales agent in the nation in 1965. He also served as the state president and national vice-president for the Jaycees before entering politics.

Politics

Randolph was first elected to the Alaska House in 1970 as a Republican. He was re-elected in 1972, but did not seek re-election in 1974, likely in protest of financial reporting laws which had just been enacted. A number of fellow legislators, also self-employed, had resigned from the legislature around this same time.

Dick Randolph joined the Libertarian Party (LP) in the wake of the 1976 presidential election, after having met its nominee Roger MacBride during one of his campaign trips to Alaska. For roughly the next eight years, Randolph would serve as the public face of the LP in Alaska.

Running as a Libertarian in 1978 Randolph finished fifth out of 17 candidates, taking one of the six State House seats in District 20. He was re-elected in 1980, coming in first out of 18 candidates, with his fellow Libertarian Ken Fanning taking 4th and giving the Alaska LP two of the six seats in District 20.

As the Libertarian candidate in the 1982 gubernatorial election, Randolph and his running mate Donnis Thompson received nearly 15% of the vote.

References

This article uses text taken from LPedia and Wikiberal under the GFDL.

External links
 Richard Randolph at 100 Years of Alaska's Legislature

1936 births
Living people
Alaska Libertarians
American businesspeople in insurance
Businesspeople from Fairbanks, Alaska
Idaho State University alumni
Insurance agents
Libertarian Party (United States) officeholders
Republican Party members of the Alaska House of Representatives
Politicians from Fairbanks, Alaska
People from Salmon, Idaho
People from Valdez, Alaska
People from Bristol Bay Borough, Alaska